Michael Thomas "Mick" McGuire is a retired United States Air Force major general, and former adjutant general of the Arizona National Guard. A member of the Republican Party, he was a candidate for its nomination in the 2022 United States Senate election in Arizona.

Early life and education 
McGuire has lived in Arizona most of his adult life. He graduated from Arcadia High School, attending the United States Air Force Academy where he obtained Bachelor of Science in chemistry. His education includes Squadron Officer School (SOS), Air Command and Staff College (ACSC), Air War College (AWC), Joint Task Force Commanders Course (NORTHCOM), Contingency Dual Status Command program, Senior Leadership Officer Course (SLOC), CAPSTONE, Harvard University, Senior Executives in National and International Security (SENIS), and Advanced Senior Leader Development Program-Strategic Engagement Seminar (ASLDP-SES).

Military service 
McGuire received his commission from the United States Air Force Academy in 1987, and graduated pilot training at Sheppard Air Force Base.

As an F-16 fighter pilot, he flew combat missions during the Gulf War and Operation Northern Watch.

McGuire became the adjutant general of the Arizona National Guard in 2013. In 2020, he oversaw the mobilization of 85% of its troops to concurrently support border patrol, address civil unrest, and assist in the fight against COVID-19.

On January 8, 2021, McGuire was ordered to send Arizona National Guard troops to Washington, D.C. in response to the 2021 United States Capitol attack. He was the only adjutant general of the 54 state and territory adjutant generals to refuse the order due to concerns about the legality of the mission. He retired three months later.

Assignments
His assignments include F-16C, 56th Tactical Training Wing, MacDill AFB, Fla., F-16 Pilot, 4th Fighter Squadron, Hill AFB, Utah, deployment; August 1990 - March 1991, Pilot, Desert Storm/Desert Watch, United Arab Emirates, September 1992 - September 1993, F-16C Instructor Pilot/Programmer, 314th Fighter Squadron, Luke AFB, Ariz., September 1993 - September 1994, F-16C/D Instructor Pilot, 61st Fighter Squadron, Luke AFB, Ariz, September 1994 - March 1996, Flight Commander, 61st Fighter Squadron, Luke AFB, Ariz., March 1996 - October 1997, Weapons and Tactics Flight Commander, 354th Operations Support Squadron, Eielson AFB, Alaska, October 1997 - May 2001, F-16 Instructor Pilot, 18th Fighter Squadron, Eielson AFB, Alaska, deployment; April 1998 - July 1998, Pilot, Southern Watch, Saudi Arabia; September 2000 - October 2000, Pilot, Northern Watch, Turkey, May 2001 - May 2005, Assistant Director of Operations, F-16 Instructor Pilot, 148th Fighter Squadron, Air National Guard, Ariz., May 2005 - May 2006, Vice Commander, Operation Snowbird, F-16 A/C Instructor Pilot, 162nd Fighter Wing Detachment, ANG, Ariz., May 2007 - May 2008, Director of Operations, 148th Fighter Squadron, Tucson, ANG, Ariz., May 2008 - January 2010, Commander, 148th Fighter Squadron, ANG, Ariz., February 2010 - January 2011, Commander, 214th Reconnaissance Group, Davis-Monthan AFB, Ariz., deployment; April 2010 - December 2010, Pilot, Operation Enduring Freedom/Operation Iraqi Freedom, Davis-Monthan AFB, Ariz., February 2011 - September 2013, Commander, 162nd Fighter Wing, ANG, Ariz., September 2013 – April 2022, Adjutant General, Arizona, Phoenix, Arizona

Flight information

McGuire was rated as a command pilot and flew more than 4,000 hours in F-16 aircraft models A/C/E, MQ-1B.

Awards and decorations
Legion of Merit
Meritorious Service Medal three bronze oak leaf clusters
Air Medal
Aerial Achievement Medal with two bronze oak leaf clusters
Air Force Commendation Medal
Air Force Achievement medal bronze oak leaf cluster
Air Force Outstanding Unit Citation "V" device and oak leaf cluster
Combat Readiness Medal
National Defense Service Medal with bronze star
Southwest Asia Campaign with two bronze stars
Global War on Terror Service Medal
Air Force Overseas Ribbon - Short Tour
Air Force Overseas Ribbon - Long Tour
Air Force Longevity Service Medal with silver oak leaf cluster
Armed Forces Reserve Medal with hourglass
Air Force Training Ribbon
Kuwait Liberation Medal - Saudi Arabia
Kuwait Liberation Medal - Kuwait

2022 U.S. Senate race 

McGuire announced his candidacy for U.S. Senate in Arizona on June 8, 2021, but lost the August 2, 2022, Republican primary to Blake Masters.

References

Living people
Arizona Republicans
Candidates in the 2022 United States Senate elections
Military personnel from Arizona
United States Air Force Academy alumni
United States Air Force generals
Year of birth missing (living people)